The 2015 Black Reel Awards, which annually recognize and celebrate the achievements of black people in feature, independent and television films, were announced on Thursday, February 19, 2015. Dear White People and Selma lead all films with ten nominations apiece.

Selma was the big winner of the night winning eight awards including Outstanding Picture, Director (Ava DuVernay) and Actor (David Oyelowo). The Trip to Bountiful and Gun Hill took home three awards followed by Dear White People with two wins.

Winners and nominees
Winners are listed first and highlighted in bold.

References

Black Reel Awards
2015 film awards
2015 in American cinema
2015 awards in the United States